Lee Monroe Gross III (born July 29, 1953) is a former professional American football center. He was selected in the second round (32nd overall) of the 1975 NFL Draft after playing college football for the Auburn Tigers.  He spent four seasons in the National Football League (NFL), three for the New Orleans Saints (1975–1977) and one with the Baltimore Colts (1979). Gross has 2 sons.  His older son, Lee, played football for the Texas Christian University in the mid 1990s.  His younger is former Major League Baseball outfielder and current Auburn Tigers assistant baseball coach Gabe Gross.

References

1953 births
Living people
American football centers
Auburn Tigers football players
Baltimore Colts players
New Orleans Saints players
Players of American football from Montgomery, Alabama